The KLW SE32C is a low-emissions  diesel road locomotive built by Knoxville Locomotive Works. To date, five SE32C locomotives have been produced with three such models being delivered to the Lancaster and Chester Railroad in November 2022.

Original buyers

See also
 List of GM-EMD locomotives

References

External links
  – Official KLW Website
  – Official Road Locomotive Page

C-C locomotives
KLW locomotives
Railway locomotives introduced in 2015
Diesel-electric locomotives of the United States
EPA Tier 3-compliant locomotives of the United States
Rebuilt locomotives
Standard gauge locomotives of the United States